The Wild Thornberrys Movie is a 2002 American animated adventure film based on the  television series of the same name. Directed by Cathy Malkasian and Jeff McGrath, the film follows Eliza Thornberry, on her quest to save a cheetah cub named Tally from ruthless poachers. It was produced by Klasky Csupo and distributed by Paramount Pictures and  Nickelodeon Movies. The film was released on December 20, 2002, to mostly positive reviews and grossed more than $60 million worldwide. 

The film was also nominated for Best Original Song at the 75th Academy Awards, making it the first and only film based on a Nicktoon to be nominated. It is also the third film to be based on a Klasky Csupo series (after The Rugrats Movie and Rugrats in Paris: The Movie). A crossover/sequel titled Rugrats Go Wild, featuring characters from Rugrats was released on June 13, 2003.

Plot

Eliza Thornberry plays with a family of cheetahs in East Africa's Kenya after their mother, Akela, puts her in charge of the cubs. When Eliza accidentally strays too far from the cheetahs' home, poachers in a helicopter kidnap one of the cheetah cubs, Tally. Eliza is determined to save the cub, causing her older sister Debbie to tell her family about Eliza's antics. This prompts her caring but straight-laced grandmother Cordelia to send Eliza to a boarding school in London for her safety - much to Debbie's dismay, since Debbie wanted a normal life. Upon arriving, Eliza discovers that her pet chimpanzee, Darwin, stowed away in her suitcase. He attempts to blend in, but gets himself and Eliza in trouble.

After having a dream in which Shaman Mnyambo tells her that Tally is alive and to go rescue him, Eliza convinces her roommate Sarah Wellington to buy plane tickets for her and Darwin to return to Africa. While taking a train from Nairobi, they encounter an injured male rhinoceros, who was shot at the river by the same poachers who kidnapped Tally. They jump off the train to save the rhino with the help of veterinarians Bree and Sloan Blackburn. Meanwhile, Debbie is left alone with her feral adoptive younger brother Donnie at their Comvee, while their parents, Nigel and Marianne, go to film a solar eclipse at Tembo Valley. Eliza returns to the Comvee for supplies, and has a small confrontation with Debbie, who demands to know why Eliza ran away from London and gave up her chance for a normal life. Eliza locks her in a cage, but Debbie escapes and pursues her, Darwin, and Donnie using her parents' motorcycle. Cordelia and her husband, Colonel Radcliffe, try to find Eliza and take her back to London before Nigel and Marianne find out; however, they meet up with Nigel and Marianne to inform them of Eliza's escape. They also begin searching for Debbie, Eliza, Donnie and Darwin.

Darwin, Eliza, and Donnie meet a gorilla who mentions seeing people setting up a fence across Tembo Valley. They then run into the Blackburns again, and Eliza concludes that the poachers are targeting the elephant herd traveling through the valley. The trio are invited to spend the night at the Blackburns' RV, but the next day, they find Tally inside the RV. The Blackburns reveal their true agenda as the poachers and capture them, revealing that the fence is electrified. Eliza and Darwin have a falling out, with Eliza angrily telling Darwin to be quiet for once. Meanwhile, Debbie meets a local Mbuti boy named Boko, who assists her at the request of his village elders. The two reach the Blackburns' RV, but Sloan holds Debbie hostage after she reveals she's Eliza's sister. When Sloan threatens to kill Debbie if Eliza doesn't tell him how she discovered their plan, Eliza admits it was because of her ability to talk to animals. A storm comes and takes away Eliza's powers while the Blackburns flee in their helicopter. Eliza, Debbie, Darwin, Donnie and Tally escape by riding a log on the river.

After the storm, Eliza tells Debbie about her ability to talk to animals and that she lost it because she revealed her secret to the Blackburns. Debbie is moved that Eliza gave up her powers to save her. They reach Tembo Valley in time to see the elephant herd heading for the electric fence. When Eliza becomes doubtful of herself, Debbie reminds her that she has been helping animals long before gaining her powers, restoring her confidence. When the eclipse begins, the Blackburns order their men to set off explosives, scaring the elephants and making them charge toward the fence. Eliza triggers the fence's electricity prematurely using a medal that Nigel gave her, causing the herd to stop temporarily, then convinces the lead elephant to turn around. Infuriated, Sloan throws Eliza into a river and attempts to shoot the elephants, but they pull the Blackburns' helicopter out of the air by its rope ladder and destroy it, causing Sloan and Bree to fall. Eliza nearly drowns until Shaman Mnyambo saves her; he praises her for saving the elephants using her heart instead of her powers. As a reward, he returns her powers, on the condition that Debbie will also keep Eliza's powers a secret.

Following the eclipse, the Blackburns have survived the fall and are arrested by rangers. Eliza reconciles with Darwin and she reunites with her family, who decide not to send her back to boarding school since she saved the elephants. Boko returns to his village, keeping Debbie's watch as a memento. The lead elephant returns Eliza's medal to her and expresses her gratitude. The Thornberrys return to the Savannah, where Eliza reunites Tally with his family. Eliza tells Debbie she will turn into a baboon if she reveals Eliza's secret, much to her anger, and in the process frightens a group of baboons Nigel and Marianne are filming. One of them activates the radio, which plays music that the Thornberrys and the baboons dance to.

Voice cast

Reception

Box office
The film opened in the U.S. box office on December 20, 2002, and finished at #6 for the weekend, with only $6 million for 3,012 theaters, for an average of only $1,997 per venue. The film ended up with a modest $40 million domestically, partly because the film came out on the same week as The Lord of the Rings: The Two Towers. But, in light of generally favorable reviews, it managed to out-gross its holiday animated feature behind Treasure Planet, which only grossed about $38 million domestically.

It is one of only fourteen feature films to be released in over 3,000 theaters, and still improve on its box office performance in its second weekend, increasing 22.5% from $6 million to $7.4 million.

Critical response
The site's consensus states: "The Wild Thornberrys Movie brings its beloved clan to the big screen for an animated adventure that should prove entertaining for all ages." On Metacritic the film has a weighted average score of 69 out of 100, based on 25 critics, indicating "generally favorable reviews". Audiences polled by CinemaScore gave the film an average grade of "A" on an A+ to F scale. Roger Ebert and Richard Roeper both praised the film and gave it “Two Thumbs Up” on their television show.

Kevin Thomas of the Los Angeles Times called it "a witty and delightful Christmas present for the entire family". Thomas said it "balances some honest heart-tugging with a sophisticated sense of humor", making it rare among children's films.  Writing for The New York Times, Dave Kehr described it as an "extended Saturday morning cartoon" that is "bland but harmless", comparing it negatively to Disney's The Lion King. In USA Today, Claudia Puig rated it 3/4 stars and wrote, "The Wild Thornberrys will no doubt brighten the day of parents looking for family activities during the holidays." It was also reviewed by Boston.com and Film4.

Accolades
The film was nominated for an Academy Award for Best Original Song for "Father and Daughter" by Paul Simon, but lost to "Lose Yourself" by Eminem for 8 Mile.

Home media
Paramount Home Entertainment released The Wild Thornberrys Movie on VHS and DVD on April 1, 2003.

Video game
THQ released a video game of the movie, released for the Game Boy Advance and PC. The game's story mode you control Eliza as it loosely follows the events of the movie, and contains mini-games that allow the player to control other members of the Thornberrys.

Music

Soundtrack

An original soundtrack for the film was released on November 26, 2002, on compact disc and audio cassette by Zomba Music, Jive Records, and Nick Records. The executive producer was George Acogny. Paul Simon's "Father and Daughter", written for the film, was released as a single. It went on to be nominated for an Academy Award for Best Song, as well as the Golden Globe Award for Best Original Song.

Score

The score was released on April 8, 2003, from Silverline Records, and includes the theme song "Bridge to the Stars", music by Randy Kerber (who composed the additional music for the score) and J. Peter Robinson, with lyrics by Maribeth Derry and performed by Tracey Amos and Lisa McClowry. The album is currently out of print.

Crossover/Sequel

A crossover with Rugrats (another series from Klasky Csupo), Rugrats Go Wild, was released on June 13, 2003.

See also
 List of films featuring eclipses

References

External links

 
 

2002 films
2002 animated films
2000s American animated films
American children's animated adventure films
2000s English-language films
Animated films about families
Animated films based on animated series
Animated films based on animated television series
Animated films set in England
Films about father–daughter relationships
Animated films about children
Films about animal rights
Films about missing people
Films directed by Jeff McGrath
Films set in Kenya
Films set in the Democratic Republic of the Congo
Klasky Csupo animated films
Nickelodeon animated films
Nickelodeon Movies films
Paramount Pictures animated films
Paramount Pictures films
The Wild Thornberrys films
Films about cheetahs